Narahari Acharya, (Nepali:नरहरि आचार्य) a central member of Nepali Congress, assumed the post of the Minister of Law, Justice, Constituent Assembly, Parliamentary Affairs and Peace and Reconstruction on 25 February 2014 under Sushil Koirala-led government.

He is a member of the 2nd Nepalese Constituent Assembly. He won the Kathmandu–5 seat in 2013 Nepalese Constituent Assembly election from the Nepali Congress.

Personal life
Narahari Acharya was born on 27 September 1953 in Bisharnagar, Kathmandu, Nepal to Umanath Acharya and Rewati Acharya. He holds a Master's Degree in Humanities and has taught for 16 years at the Tribhuvan University. He is married to the writer Sharada Sharma and has two daughters.

Political career
Acharya involved in politics joining Nepali Congress in 1968 though he only took the party membership in 1997. He became a member of the National Assembly in 1992 and was appointed as Minister for Law, Justice, Constituent Assembly and Parliamentary Affairs.

He won the 2008 Nepalese Constituent Assembly election from Kathmandu 5 constituency with 13,245 votes defeating CPN (UML) general secretary Ishwor Pokhrel who had received 9,120 votes. He was also jailed for 1 year in course of his political activities.

Electoral history

2013 Constituent Assembly election

2008 Constituent Assembly election

References

1953 births
Living people
People from Kathmandu
Nepalese educators
Nepali Congress politicians from Bagmati Province
Government ministers of Nepal
Bahun
Members of the National Assembly (Nepal)
20th-century Nepalese educators
21st-century Nepalese educators
Khas people

Members of the 1st Nepalese Constituent Assembly
Members of the 2nd Nepalese Constituent Assembly